Safonovsky District is an administrative and municipal district (raion), one of the twenty-five in Smolensk Oblast, Russia. It is located in the northern central part of the oblast. Its administrative center is the town of Safonovo. Population: 61,572 (2010 Census);  The population of Safonovo accounts for 74.9% of the district's total population.

References

Notes

Sources

Districts of Smolensk Oblast